Aireys Inlet is a small coastal inlet and town located on the Great Ocean Road, southwest of Melbourne, Victoria, Australia. Aireys Inlet is located between Anglesea and Lorne, and joined with Fairhaven, Moggs Creek, and Eastern View to the west.

Many surfers holiday in Aireys Inlet to take advantage of the popular Fairhaven beach. As the inclination of the beach can change dramatically between years, the surf is regarded as unpredictable. Swimmers should take note there is a strong rip current.

Painkalac Creek, which separates Aireys Inlet from Fairhaven, forms a salt lake or inlet behind the sand dunes before it cuts through to the ocean. Due to low water levels in the inlet it is not often that the inlet breaks through.

Aireys Inlet is also famous for Split Point Lighthouse which was featured in the popular children's TV show Round The Twist.

There is also a horseshoe-shaped reef at Step Beach which forms an excellent swimming hole at low tide. The towns main attraction, the Split Point Lighthouse overlooks the inlet. The lighthouse has made Aireys Inlet an icon along the Great Ocean Road.

History
In the early 19th century, before British settlement, the escaped convict William Buckley lived here in a primitive hut eating fish, shellfish, wild raspberries and sugar ants. Aireys Inlet was known to the Aboriginals of the time as Managwhawz. The town takes its current name from John Moore Cole Airey, who settled in the area in 1842.

The Post Office opened on 1 April 1893.

Population
The most common responses for religion were No Religion 53.9% and Catholic 16.1%.

Geography 
Fairhaven, Moggs Creek, and Eastern View are in the same postal area as Aireys Inlet.

School 
Aireys Inlet has one school, Aireys Inlet Primary School (P-6), which until the end of 2016 was a campus of the then Lorne-Aireys Inlet P-12 College.

Sport 

 Australian football: The Aireys Inlet Eels Football Club competes in the AFL Barwon junior competition.
 Tennis: The Aireys Inlet and District Tennis Club competes in the Geelong Tennis Association.

Literature and media

During the early 1950s the Australian crime author Arthur Upfield lived at Aireys Inlet. His novel The New Shoe (1951) is based on the township and the lighthouse. Some of the novel's characters drew on local identities.

Many scenes from the children's television series Round the Twist were filmed at or around the area of the Split Point Lighthouse.

In 2005 the Bollywood movie Salaam Namaste was produced in Melbourne with many scenes being shot around Aireys Inlet, Fairhaven and Anglesea.

Beaches and coastline

While the coastline at adjacent Fairhaven is a long uninterrupted sand beach, the coast at Aireys Inlet is a series of rock shelves, interrupted by sandy swimming beaches, most of which are relatively secluded. Each beach has its own character, a result of differing lengths, orientation and nearby rock formations.  Beaches include Sandy Gully, Steppy Beach and Sunnymeade.

At low tide it is possible to walk (or scramble) around all these rocks and beaches, making it possible to walk along the beach, all the way from Eastern View - the historical start of the Great Ocean Road, all the way to Anglesea.

1983 Ash Wednesday bushfires

Aireys Inlet was devastated by the infamous 1983 Ash Wednesday bushfires in which a large number of houses were burnt down. However, after a brief lull, interest in the area resumed and has been steadily climbing since. Properties, especially those with an ocean view, are becoming increasingly sought after, some going for greater than A$1 million.

Heritage listed sites

Aireys Inlet has a number of heritage listed sites, including:

 Great Ocean Road
 Split Point Lightstation Complex

Notable people 

 John Airey, the town's founder, for whom it was named
 William Buckley, British convict who lived in the area before the town's origin

References

External links

 (Archived 2009-10-24)
Australian Places - Aireys Inlet
REIV Aireys Inlet Market Insights, Auction & Private Sale Results

Towns in Victoria (Australia)
Surf Coast Shire
Coastal towns in Victoria (Australia)
Great Ocean Road